Alfred Maxwell Ashmore (born 11 September 1937) is an English former professional footballer who played as a goalkeeper.

Career
Born in Woodhouse, Ashmore played for Sheffield United, Bradford City and Chesterfield. For Sheffield United, he made 1 appearance in the Football League. For Bradford City, he made 9 appearances in the Football League. For Chesterfield, he made 2 appearances in the Football League. He later played non-league football for Heanor Town.

Sources

References

1937 births
Living people
English footballers
Sheffield United F.C. players
Bradford City A.F.C. players
Chesterfield F.C. players
English Football League players
Association football goalkeepers
Heanor Town F.C. players